Bad Dreams is a studio album by musician Ike Turner released on United Artists Records in 1973. The album cover was illustrated by Mike Salisbury who also created the cover for the Ike & Tina Turner album Live! The World of Ike & Tina.

Critical reception 

Reviewing the album in Christgau's Record Guide: Rock Albums of the Seventies, Robert Christgau wrote: After twenty years of raking it in from the shadows, he's finally figured out a way of applying his basically comic bass/baritone to rock and roll. Studio-psychedelic New Orleans, echoes of the Band and Dr. John, some brilliant minor r&b mixed in with the dumb stuff. My God—at the moment he's more interesting than Tina.

Reissues 
Bad Dreams was reissued in 2012 by BGO Records on the compilation CD Blues Roots/Bad Dreams.

Track listing 
All tracks written by Ike Turner except where noted.

Personnel
Technical
Barry Keene, John Mills, Ike Turner - engineer
Mike Salisbury - design
W.T. Vinson - cover illustration

References 

1973 albums
Albums produced by Ike Turner
Ike Turner albums
United Artists Records albums
Albums recorded at Bolic Sound